Dal Yong Jin is a media studies scholar. He is Distinguished SFU Professor in the School of Communication at Simon Fraser University, Vancouver, Canada where his research explores digital platforms, digital games, media history, political economy of communication, globalization and trans-nationalization, the Korean Wave, and science journalism. He has published more than 30 books and penned more than 200 journal articles, book chapters, and book reviews. Jin has delivered numerous keynote speeches, conference presentations, invited lectures, and media interviews on subjects such as digital platforms, video games, globalization, transnational culture, and the Korean Wave. Based on his academic performance, he was awarded the Outstanding Scholar Award from the Korean American Communication Association at the KACA 40th Anniversary Conference in 2018, while receiving the Outstanding Research Award from the Deputy Prime Ministry and Minister of the Education of South Korea. He was also awarded ICA Fellow, which is primarily a recognition of distinguished scholarly contributions at the International Communication Association Conference held in Paris in 2022. Jin has been interviewed by international media outlets, including Elle, New York Times, The Washington Post, NBC, The Guardian, The Vancouver Sun, Chicago Tribune, The Telegraph, Wired, LA Times, and China Daily as one of the world’s leading scholars on Korean pop culture and these subject matters.

Background and education
Jin was born in Suwon, South Korea. He attended Yonsei University. After working as a newspaper reporter for many years, he resumed his academic journey. He holds a master's degree in Public Affairs from the University of Texas at Austin. In 2005 he received his Ph.D. degree at the Institute of Communications Research from the University of Illinois, Urbana-Champaign. He is the founding book series editor of Routledge Research in Digital Media and Culture in Asia, while directing The Transnational Culture and Digital Technology Lab.

Academic career
ICA Fellow (international Communication Association Fellow)
Distinguished SFU Professor, School of Communication, Simon Fraser University, Vancouver, Canada
Director of The Transnational Culture and Digital Technology Lab, Simon Fraser University
Director of CPROST (Center for Policy Research on Science and Technology)
Simon Fraser University, Researcher
Visiting Associate Professor, School of Communication, Yonsei University, South Korea
Adjunct Associate Professor, International Summer Campus, Korea University
Associate Professor, Korea Advanced Institute of Science and Technology (KAIST), Korea Master Program of Science Journalism School of Humanities and Social Science
Research at The Platform Lab, Concordia University
Visiting Researcher, Rikkyo University, Tokyo, Japan
Research Associate, Center for Intercultural New Media Research, Marquette University
Visiting Assistant Professor, Department of Communication, University of Illinois at Chicago

Scholarship

Jin has developed several significant theories and conceptual frameworks, such as platform imperialism, de-convergence, and new Korean wave, as well as e-Sports. His works have been received well in several fields, including political economy of communication, globalization, digital games, platform studies, and Asian media studies. In particular, as Vincent Mosco indicates in his book titled Political Economy of Communication (2009)., Jin has been known as a leading political economist. He has also been known as a cultural economist among some scholars, including Japanese media scholars, as indicated in Mechademia 1: Emerging Worlds of Anime and Manga However, as indicated in his numerous publications, he used to converge political economy and cultural studies in both theoretical frameworks and methodologies. Jin's research has received a number of awards and grants from national and international associations, including the International Communication Association, the Social Sciences and Humanities Research Council of Canada, the National Research Foundation of Korea, the Korean American Communication Association, and the Academy of Korean Studies. He was also nominated for Young Scholar Award at the International Communication Association, and he was inducted as a Fellow of the International Communication Association in May 2022. His book titled Korea's Online Game Empire was nominated as the Book of the Year at the International Communication Association. Jin is the founding editor of a book series entitled Routledge Research in Digital Media and Culture in Asia.

Publications

Books
Jin, Dal Yong (2022). Understanding Korean Webtoon Culture: Transmedia Storytelling, Digital Platforms, and Genres. Cambridge, MA: Harvard University Asia Center/ Harvard University Press.
Jin, Dal Yong (2022). Global South Discourse in East Asian Media Studies. London: Routledge.
Jin, Dal Yong (2022). Ten Debates on the Hallyu Mythology. (한류신화에 관한 10가지 논쟁). Seoul: Hanul Plus (in Korean).
Jin, Dal Yong (2022). Understanding of Science Journalism (과학저널리즘 이해, in Korean) (2nd edition). Seoul: Hanul Plus.
Jin, Dal Yong (2021). Artificial Intelligence in Cultural Production: critical perspectives in digital platforms. London: Routledge.
Jin, Dal Yong (ed.)(2021).The Routledge Handbook of Digital Media and Globalization. London: Routledge.
Jin, Dal Yong (ed.) (2021). Global Esports: Transformation of Cultural Perceptions of Competitive Gaming. London: Bloomsbury.
Hong, Seok Kyeong and Dal Yong Jin (eds.) (2021). Transnational Convergence of East Asia Pop Culture. London: Routledge.
Jin, Dal Yong, Kyong Yoon, and Wonjung Min (2021). Transnational Hallyu: The Globalization of Korean Digital and Popular Culture. London: Rowman & Littlefield.
Jin, Dal Yong (ed.) (2020). Transmedia Storytelling in East Asia: The Age of Digital Media. London: Routledge.
Jin, Dal Yong (2019). Transnational Korean Cinema: cultural politics, film genres, and digital technologies. Rutgers University Press.
Jin, Dal Yong (2019). Globalization and Media in the Digital Platform Age. London: Routledge.
Lee, Hark Joon and Dal Yong Jin (2019). K-Pop Idols: Popular Culture and the Emergence of the Korean Music Industry. Lanham, MD: Lexington.
Jin, Dal Yong and Wendy Su (2019) (eds.). Asia-Pacific Film Co-productions: theory, industry and aesthetics. London: Routledge.
Jin, Dal Yong and Kwak, Nojin (2018) (eds.). Communication, Digital Media, and Popular Culture in Korea: contemporary research and future prospects. Lanham MD: Lexington.
Lee, Micky and Jin, Dal Yong (2017). Understanding the Business of Global Media in the Digital Age. London: Routledge.
Yoon, Tae-jin, Jin, Dal Yong (2017) (eds.). The Korean Wave: evolution, fandom, and transnationality. Lanham, MD: Lexington.
Jin, Dal Yong (2017). Smartland Korea: mobile communication, culture and society. Ann Arbor, MI: University of Michigan Press.
Jin, Dal Yong (2016). (ed.). Mobile Gaming in Asia: Politics, Culture and Emerging Technologies. New York: Springer.
Jin, Dal Yong (2016). New Korean Wave: transnational cultural power in the age of social media. Urbana, IL: University of Illinois Press.
Jin, Dal Yong (2015). Digital Platforms, Imperialism and Political Culture. London: Routledge.
Jin, Dal Yong (2015). Understanding of Science Journalism (과학저널리즘 이해, in Korean). Seoul: Hanul.
Jin, Dal Yong (2013). De-Convergence of Global Media Industries. New York: Routledge
Jin, Dal Yong (2011). Hands On/Hands Off: The Korean State and the Market Liberalization of the Communication Industry. Cresskill, NJ: Hampton Press.
Winseck, Dwayne and Jin, Dal Yong (eds.) (2011). The Political Economies of Media: the transformation of the global media industries. London: Bloomsbury.
Jin, Dal Yong (2011). Reinterpretation of Cultural Imperialism (문화제국주의의 재해석, in Korean). Seoul: Communication Books.
Jin, Dal Yong (ed.) (2010). Global Media Convergence and Cultural Transformation: Emerging Social Patterns and Characteristics. Hershey, PA: IGI Global.
Jin, Dal Yong (2010). Korea's Online Gaming Empire. Boston, MA: MIT Press.

Book Series Editor
 Routledge Research in Digital Media and Culture in Asia

Journal special issues
Jin, Dal Yong and Lee, Hyang Soon (2020). Transnationality of Popular Culture in the Korean Wave. Korea Journal 61(1): 5-178.
Jin, Dal Yong (2019). East Asian Perspective in Transmedia Storytelling. International Journal of Communication 13: 2085-2238.
Jin, Dal Yong (2019). Transnationalism, Cultural Flows, and the Rise of the Korean Wave around the Globe. International Communication Gazette 81(2): 117-208.
Jin, Dal Yong (2017). Digital Korea. Media, Culture and Society 39(5): 715-777.
Jin, Dal Yong and Tae-jin Yoon (2017, Special Issue). In Retrospect of the Korean Wave: 20 Years and Prospect. International Journal of Communication 11: 2241-2386.
Jin, Dal Yong and Florian Schneider (2016, Special Issue). The Dynamics of Digital Play in Asia. Asiascape: Digital Asia (DIAS) 3(1/2): 1-111.
Jin, Dal Yong and Nissim Otmazgin (2014, Special Issue). The Emergence of Asian Cultural Industries: Policies, Strategies, and Trajectories. Pacific Affairs 87(1): 43-114.
Jin, Dal Yong (2010, Special Issue). Games and Culture: Asia-Pacific Perspective. Iowa Journal of Communication 42(1): 1-94.

Recent journal articles
Jin, Dal Yong (2022). “Transnational Capitalism and the Korean Wave.” International Journal of Asia Pacific Studies 18(2) https://ijaps.usm.my/?page_id=6642
Jin, Dal Yong (2021). “Ten Myths about the Korean Wave in the Global Cultural Sphere.” International Journal of Communication 15: 4147-4164.
Jin, Dal Yong (2021). "Encounters with Western Media Theory: Asian Perspectives.” Media, Culture & Society 43(1): 150-157.
Jin, Dal Yong (2020). “Comparative Discourse on J-pop and K-pop: Hybridity in Contemporary Local Music” Korea Journal 60(1): 40-70.
Courtney McLaren and Dal Yong Jin (2020). "You Can’t Help But Love Them”: BTS, Transcultural Fandom, and Affective Identities. Korea Journal 60(1): 100-127.
Jin, Dal Yong (2019). “Transnationalism, Cultural Flows, and the Rise of the Korean Wave around the Globe.” International Communication Gazette 81(2): 17-20.
Jin, Dal Yong (2018). "Evolution of Korea's Mobile Technologies: from a historical approach." Mobile Media and Communication 6(1): 71-87.
Jin, Dal Yong (2018). "An Analysis of the Korean Wave as Transnational Popular Culture: North American Youth Engage Through Social Media as TV Becomes Obsolete." International Journal of Communication 12: 404-422.
Jin, Dal Yong (2017). "Digital Platform as a Double-edged Sword: How to Interpret Cultural Flows in the Platform Era." International Journal of Communication 11:3880-3898.
Jin, Dal Yong (2017). Critical Analysis of Pokémon GO Phenomenon. Mobile Media and Communication 5(1): 55-58.
Jin, Dal Yong (2017). "Construction of Digital Korea: the evolution of new communication technologies in the 21st century." Media, Culture & Society 39(5): 715-726.
Jin, Dal Yong and Kyong Yoon (2016). "The social mediascape of transnational Korean pop culture: Hallyu 2.0 as spreadable media practice." New Media and Society 18(7): 1277-1292.
Jin, Dal Yong (2016). "Socio-cultural Interpretation of the Bow and Arrow in Digital Media: The Hunger Games versus War of the Arrow" Triple C: Communication, Capitalism & Critique 14(1): 279-291.
Jin, Dal Yong and Florian Schneider (2016). "The Dynamics of Digital Play in Asia." Asiascape: Digital Asia 3 (1/2): 5-15.

Academic Interviews

Mutlu Binark (2018). "Interview with Dal Yong Jin: Creative Industries and South Korea.”Moment Dergi (Moment Journal): Journal of Cultural Studies 5(2): 281-293.

References

Living people
People from Suwon
Mass media scholars
South Korean emigrants to Canada
Yonsei University alumni
University of Texas alumni
University of Illinois Urbana-Champaign College of Media alumni
Academic staff of Simon Fraser University
Year of birth missing (living people)